Mao Ning, may refer to:

 Mao Ning (singer), Chinese singer.

 Mao Ning (diplomat), Chinese diplomat, the spokesperson of Ministry of Foreign Affairs.